Student rights encompass:
 Student rights in primary education
 Student rights in secondary education
 Student rights in higher education

These are sometimes collected and formalized in a student bill of rights.

Rights
Student politics